James Gibb Stuart (30 August 1920 – 23 September 2013) was a financial author, owner of Ossian Publishers, and chairman of the Scottish Pure Water Association. He was known for his outspoken opposition to the European Union, and for publishing a book on monetary reform, The Money Bomb, in which he advocates a complete overhaul of British currency, the pound sterling.

The Money Bomb
When The Money Bomb was published in 1983, well-documented efforts to quash any publicity clashed with advocacy of its arguments by the Margaret Thatcher government, who were struggling to freeze that country's national debt at twelve billion pounds .

Publications
(Incomplete)
The Mind Benders - Gradual Revolution and Scottish Independence, Glasgow, 1978, 
The Lemming Folk, Glasgow, 1980, 
The Money Bomb, Glasgow, 1983,  or (P/B) 
Scotland And Its Money, Edinburgh, July 1991, 
Fantopia, Glasgow, 2000,

References

External links
Money Reform Party
Stuart titles

1920 births
2013 deaths
Monetary reformers